A breadboard is a construction base used in electric/electronic circuit prototyping.

Breadboard may also refer to:

Breadboard or cutting board, a food preparation utensil (of which the first electronic breadboards were made)
A pull-out cutting board underneath a counter (furniture)
Optical breadboard, used in optics labs
Mechanical breadboard, sometimes used in developing mechanical systems
Brassboard, a stage in engineering prototype development